The Criminal Mind is Gone's third album after an 8-year hiatus, with original member Greg Ginn and new bassist Steve Sharp and drummer Gregory Moore. Unlike the first two albums the music is more tight and precise.

Track listing
"Poor Losers" (2:11)
"Punch Drunk" (2:04)
"Pull It Out" (2:12)
"Pump Room" (3:37)
"Snagglepuss" (2:55)
"P.S Was Wrong" (3:01)
"Off the Chains" (3:46)
"Smoking Gun in Wasco" (2:36)
"Spankin' Plank" (2:11)
"Piled One Higher" (1:48)
"Row Nine" (2:04)
"Toggle" (2:24)
"Big Deck" (2:03)
"Ankle Strap" (2:00)
"Hand-Cut" (2:21)
"Freeny" (4:45)
"Unknown Caliber" (2:52)

Personnel
Gone
Greg Ginn - guitar
Steve Sharp - bass
Gregory Moore - drums
Technical
Andy Batwinas - engineer
Steven Murashige - art direction, illustration 

1994 albums
SST Records albums
Gone (band) albums